Mashan County is a county of Guangxi Zhuang Autonomous Region, China, it is under the administration of the prefecture-level city of Nanning, the capital of Guangxi. The northernmost county-level division of Nanning City, it borders the prefecture-level cities of Hechi to the north and Laibin to the northeast.

Area: 2664.65 km2.

Population: 492,500 in 2000, with 75.8% as Zhuang ethnic group population

Postal Code: 530600

Telephone Area Code: 0771

County government is located in Baishan Township

Transportation
China National Highway 210

Climate

References

External links
Official website of Nandan Government

 
Counties of Guangxi
Nanning